Eleuterio "Terry" Adevoso, also known by his nom de guerre, "Terry Magtanggol" (February 20, 1922 – March 22, 1975) was a Filipino war hero famous for his role as leader and co-founder of Hunters ROTC guerilla unit during the Japanese occupation of the Philippines.

He was appointed as Secretary of Labor in 1954, under the term of President Ramon Magsaysay. He ran for the Philippine Senate in 1959, but lost.

As a member of the opposition, Adevoso was arrested upon the declaration of Martial Law in September 1972. He was only released in September 1974 after languishing in jail as a political prisoner for two years.

Personal life

Terry married Carmen N. Ferrer after the war and had one child, Jesus Terry F. Adevoso (born 1946). He has three grandchildren, only two of whom he actually met; Johanna Patricia Adevoso-Cañal (born 1970) and Jay Paolo Adevoso (born 1971). The third grandchild, Jenna Crystal Adevoso-Galang, was born in 1985.

See also 
 Japanese occupation of the Philippines
 Hunters ROTC
 Ramon A. Alcaraz
 Bonifacio Mencias
 Jesus Villamor

References 

1922 births
1975 deaths
Filipino military leaders
Filipino military personnel of World War II